Étude Op. 10, No. 12 in C minor, known as the "Revolutionary Étude" or the "Étude on the Bombardment of Warsaw", is a solo piano work by Frédéric Chopin written , and the last in his first set, Etudes, Op. 10, dedicated "à son ami Franz Liszt" ("to his friend Franz Liszt").

History

The 12th Étude appeared around the same time as the November Uprising in 1831. Upon the conclusion of Poland's failed revolution against Russia, he cried, "All this has caused me much pain. Who could have foreseen it?"

Unlike études of prior periods, works designed to emphasize and develop particular aspects of musical technique, the romantic études of composers such as Chopin and Liszt are fully developed musical concert pieces, while still continuing the goal of developing stronger technique.

Technique

In the case of Op. 10, No. 12, the technique required in the opening bars is playing long, loud descending runs, which form a dominant minor ninth chord introductory build-up to the main theme. The length and repetition of these rapid passages are distinctive. The rest of the passage focuses on the left hand fingering scales and arpeggios. The opening theme, in the right hand, is notable for its powerful chordal basis.

The challenge lies with the relentless left hand semiquavers while the RH shapes widely distributed octaves into legato melodic shapes.

The left hand technique in this piece involves evenly played semiquavers throughout. The structure is in Chopin's usual ternary form (A–B–A–coda). The opening arresting figuration transitions into the main appassionato melody. The octave melody's upward ascending forte dotted rhythms and the continuous tumultuous LH accompaniment provide great drama with few moments of respite. The piece ends by recalling the opening in a final descending sweep (with both hands) descending to an F major chord, eventually cadencing on C major (tierce de Picardie).

In popular culture
Parts of it are heard in The Abbott and Costello Show episode, The Music Lover, aired on March 13, 1953. The étude was used at the beginning of the Tom and Jerry short Snowbody Loves Me. It was adapted (under the title "Rock Revolution") as the theme music to the British game show Interceptor. The song is also featured in the 2003 game The King of Fighters 2003, alongside the 2011 game Catherine. In the anime and manga series Your Lie in April, it is performed during a piano competition by the character Takeshi.

References

External links
 Mutopia Project - A public domain engraving of the score using GNU LilyPond, available in several formats.
 
 Op. 10, No. 12 played by Ignaz Friedman
 Op. 10, No. 12 played by Alfred Cortot
 Op. 10, No. 12 played by Arthur Rubinstein
 Op. 10, No. 12 played by Claudio Arrau
 Op. 10, No. 12 played by Vladimir Horowitz
 Op. 10, No. 12 played by Sviatoslav Richter
 Op. 10, No. 12 played by Tamás Vásáry
 Op. 10, No. 12 played by Adam Harasiewicz 
 Op. 10, No. 12 played by Vladimir Ashkenazy
 Op. 10, No. 12 played by Maurizio Pollini
 Chopin-Godowsky - Etude op. 10, No. 12 played by Francesco Libetta (YouTube)

10 12
November Uprising
1831 compositions
Compositions in C minor